Elmer "Kid Violent" Ray (March 3, 1911 – May 20, 1987) was an American heavyweight boxer who fought from 1926 to 1949. He was born in Federal Point, Florida. Ray was known as a hard puncher and had a career record of 86 (with 70 knockouts)-13-1. Ray never fought for the title, but did fight future heavyweight champions Ezzard Charles and Jersey Joe Walcott.  In three fights with Walcott, Ray suffered a three round knockout on September 25, 1937, rebounded to outpoint Walcott on November 15, 1946, and lost the third fight by decision (April 3, 1947). He defeated Charles on a split decision on July 25, 1947, but was knocked out in the 9th round of their rematch on May 7, 1948.  He  also boxed light heavyweight champion John Henry Lewis, but was stopped in the 12th round on May 19, 1938. In 2003, Ray made the Ring Magazine's list of 100 greatest punchers of all-time at number 44.

Professional boxing record
All information in this section is derived from BoxRec, unless otherwise stated.

Official record

All newspaper decisions are officially regarded as “no decision” bouts and are not counted in the win/loss/draw column.

Unofficial record

Record with the inclusion of newspaper decisions in the win/loss/draw column.

See also
Murderers' Row (Boxing)

References

External links

1911 births
1987 deaths
Heavyweight boxers
American male boxers